Jemima Jo M Kirke (born 26 April 1985) is a British-American artist, actress and director.  She gained international acclaim through her role as Jessa Johansson on the HBO series Girls. She made her film debut in the 2005 indie short Smile for the Camera and her feature-length debut in Tiny Furniture, as a favour for her childhood friend Lena Dunham. In 2017, she starred in Zayn's music video for the single "Dusk Till Dawn" featuring Sia.

Early life
Born in Westminster, London to British parents, Kirke was raised in New York City. She is the daughter of Simon Kirke, the former drummer of the rock bands Bad Company and Free. Her mother is Lorraine Kirke (née Dellal), the owner of Geminola, a vintage boutique in New York City that supplied a number of outfits for the television series Sex and the City. Her character Jessa wore a wedding dress from Geminola in the season finale of the first season of Girls; also, earlier in her career, she was featured along with her sisters in a fashion piece in Teen Vogue in which they wore clothing from the store.

Her father is of English and Scottish descent (the Kirkes being a junior branch of a family of Nottinghamshire landed gentry and descending also from the Gibson-Craig baronets) and her mother is Jewish. Kirke's maternal grandfather, Jack Dellal, was a British businessman of Iraqi-Jewish descent and her maternal grandmother, Zehava Helmer, was an Israeli former stewardess. Kirke has two sisters, actress Lola Kirke and singer and actress Domino Kirke. She is a cousin of curator Alexander Dellal, shoe designer Charlotte Olympia Dellal and model/photographer Alice Dellal.

Fine art
Kirke majored in art as a student and received her Bachelor of Fine Arts in painting from the Rhode Island School of Design in 2008. In late 2011, she held an exhibition titled "A Brief History" through Skylight Projects. In late 2017 to early 2018 she had a show at Sargeant's Daughters, a Lower East Side Gallery, where she exhibited portrait-style paintings, some of them neck-up, others full-figure, of women in their wedding dresses. Kirke was inspired by her own divorce and the exhibition also contained a self-portrait of Kirke in her wedding dress and veil. 

In September 2022, Kirke and husband Alex Cameron modeled for Batsheva Hay's spring collection at Ben's Kosher Deli.

Acting
Growing up in West Village, Kirke found herself accepting a number of roles on her friends' projects. Dunham asked Kirke to take on a supporting role in her debut film Tiny Furniture. Kirke and a number of other friends were called upon as a favour to Dunham since there was not enough money to pay professional actors. Although the film turned out to be profitable, Kirke received no payment. Kirke reunited with Dunham in the HBO series Girls, appearing in all six seasons from 2011 to 2017 as the character Jessa Johansson. Kirke next had supporting roles in the dark comedy films Ava's Possessions and The Little Hours. In 2018, Kirke starred alongside her real-life sister Lola Kirke in Emma Forrest's film Untogether. The film premiered at the 2018 Tribeca Film Festival.

In 2011, Kirke appeared in the music video "Wring It Out" for the group Rival Schools. Both this music video and Smile for the Camera were directed by her friend Jordan Galland. In 2017, she appeared in the music video for "Gotta Get a Grip" by Mick Jagger, directed by Saam Farahmand and appeared opposite Alex Cameron in his music video for the song "Stranger's Kiss". In September 2017, Kirke appeared opposite Zayn Malik in his music video for the song "Dusk Till Dawn".

In 2021, Kirke appeared in the Netflix series Sex Education in the role of Hope, headmistress of Moordale Secondary School. In 2021, it was announced that Kirke had accepted a role in Conversations with Friends, a series based on the book of the same name by Sally Rooney, in which she plays Melissa, an older, experienced writer fascinated by a younger couple.

Directing
Kirke's directorial debut was in 2019 when she spearheaded the video for the track "Mama" by her sister Lola Kirke. She would go onto direct other projects including a satire short film with fiancé Alex Cameron.

Activism
In 2015, Kirke partnered with the Center for Reproductive Rights to create a public service announcement to advance the future of reproductive healthcare. In the PSA, Kirke discusses the abortion she received in college where she could not afford the anesthesia in addition to the procedure and went without.

Personal life
Kirke resides in Carroll Gardens, Brooklyn and East Hampton. She married lawyer Michael Mosberg in 2009 and they have two children. In January 2017, it was announced Kirke and Mosberg had split. The couple had reportedly separated in the summer of 2016.

Kirke is close friends with Lena Dunham, the creator of Tiny Furniture and Girls. They became friends while attending Saint Ann's School in New York City.

Since July 2017, Kirke has been in a relationship with Australian musician and singer songwriter Alex Cameron. Cameron has said that his 2019 album Miami Memory is primarily influenced by his relationship with Kirke. She married Cameron in November 2020 in a private ceremony.

Filmography

Film

Television

Music videos

References

External links

1985 births
Living people
Free (band)
21st-century British actresses
Actresses from London
Actresses from New York City
American film actresses
American television actresses
American people of Iraqi-Jewish descent
American people of Israeli descent
American people of Scottish descent
Artists from London
British expatriate actresses in the United States
British women painters
English film actresses
English people of Iraqi-Jewish descent
English people of Israeli descent
English people of Scottish descent
British people of Iraqi-Jewish descent
British people of Israeli descent
English television actresses
Jewish English actresses
Rhode Island School of Design alumni
Saint Ann's School (Brooklyn) alumni
People from East Hampton (town), New York
People from Carroll Gardens, Brooklyn
English Ashkenazi Jews
American Sephardic Jews
American Mizrahi Jews